Akin Fadeyi Foundation (AFF) is a Nigerian not-for-profit established in 2016 and focuses on using technology, media and communication tools to tackle corruption. It promotes civic engagement, transparency and accountability in Nigeria through its FlagIt corruption-reporting app, campaigns, and media awareness program. It is the convener of a nationwide anti-corruption crusade, Corruption Not-In-My-Country which has been endorsed by European Union, United Nations, and the Federal Republic of Nigeria

History 
Akin Fadeyi Foundation started as a campaign against corruption, for social justice and inclusiveness. The founder, Akin Fadeyi saw the need to sustain the campaign and use communication for change approach to address insistent corruption practices in Nigeria; and then founded the organization in 2016. AFF has worked to promote good governance, social justice, and women’s right in Nigeria.
In 2017, it started Corruption Not In My Country, a Pan-Nigerian campaign against retail corruption in Nigeria which was used to mobilize young people as anti-corruption ambassadors.

Campaigns and Achievement 
 Corruption Not in My Country: Since 2017, AFF has used their campaign, Corruption Not in My Country to mobilize youth, organizations, agencies, and celebrities to stand against corrupt practices within the public sector. The campaign has been supported by the European Union, United Nations Development Program (UNDP), United Nations Office for Drugs and Crime (UNODC) and Macarthur Foundation.

 What Women Can Do: To increase women’s participation in governance, AFF with support from Macarthur Foundation launched "What Women Can Do Campaign". The campaign included competition that featured young women on leadership pitches related to topic of interests such as agriculture, education, healthcare and technology.

 Put on Your Thinking Cap: In March 2022, AFF unveiled citizen’s voting project known as “Put On Your Thinking Cap” which focuses on discouraging vote buying in Nigeria. The campaign was launched in preparation of Nigeria’s 2023 election and to mobilize citizens to ask vital questions before voting for any candidate.

Anti-Corruption Reporting 
To promote civic engagement and increase reportage of corrupt practices in Nigeria, Akin Fadeyi Foundation and Federal Road Safety Corps launched a mobile and web-based application known as FlagIt App. This has been used by citizens across the states in Nigeria to monitor and report suspected corrupt practices.

Supporters 
 MacArthur Foundation
 European Union
 United Nations Development Programme
 United Nations Office for Drugs on Crime
 Federal Road Safety Corps 
 National Orientation Agency

See also
 Ado Ekiti
 Afe Babalola University
 List of Villages in Osun State

References

 
Politics of Nigeria
History of Nigeria
Nigeria